The European Prize for Urban Public Space is a biennial award established in 2000 to recognise public space projects. It is organised by the Centre de Cultura Contemporània de Barcelona together with six other European institutions: The Architecture Foundation, Cité de l'Architecture et du Patrimoine, Architekturzentrum Wien, Netherlands Architecture Institute, German Architecture Museum and the Museum of Finnish Architecture. The number of nominations for the prize increased from 81 projects in 2000 to 347 projects in 2012, while the number of countries participating increased form 14 in the first year to 36 in 2012. Most entries have been received from Spain and only few from Central Europe.

List of award winners

References

Further reading
Magda Anglès (2010) In Favour of Public Space: Ten Years of the European Prize for Urban Public Space, Actar, 
Diane Grey (2015) Europe City: Lessons from the European Prize for Urban Public Space, Lars Müller

External links
Official website

Architecture awards
European awards
Awards established in 2000